"Tangled Up" is a song by Caro Emerald. The song was released as a Digital download on 18 February 2013 as the lead single from the album The Shocking Miss Emerald (2013). The song peaked at number 6 in the Netherlands, and has so far peaked at No77 in the UK single chart after being BBC Radio 2's playlist in the 'A' List.

The single was also certified gold by the Federation of the Italian Music Industry.

Italian gymnast Vanessa Ferrari used an instrumental version of the song as her floor exercise routine music during the 2013 World Artistic Gymnastics Championships in Antwerp, Belgium, where she won a silver medal in the floor final

Music video
A music video to accompany the release of "Tangled Up" was first released onto YouTube on 8 March 2013 at a total length of three minutes and twenty-three seconds.

Track listing

Chart performance

Weekly charts

Year-end charts

Certifications

Release history

References

2012 songs
Caro Emerald songs
Songs written by David Schreurs
2013 singles
Songs written by Guy Chambers
Songs written by Vincent DeGiorgio